Alexis Laurent Patrice Roge Flips (born 18 January 2000) is a French professional footballer who plays as a winger for Reims.

Club career
A youth product of Lille OSC, Flips was loaned to AC Ajaccio on 19 August 2019. He made his professional debut with Ajaccio in a 1–0 Ligue 2 win over Paris FC on 23 August 2019. On 5 October 2020, he transferred to Stade de Reims.

International career
Flips is a youth international for France. He represented the France U17s at the 2017 FIFA U-17 World Cup.

References

External links
 
 

2000 births
Living people
People from Villeneuve-d'Ascq
Sportspeople from Nord (French department)
French footballers
Footballers from Hauts-de-France
Association football wingers
France youth international footballers
Ligue 1 players
Ligue 2 players
Championnat National 2 players
Championnat National 3 players
Lille OSC players
AC Ajaccio players
Stade de Reims players